The women's 4 × 400 metres relay at the 2012 African Championships in Athletics was held at the Stade Charles de Gaulle on 1 July.

Medalists

Records

Schedule

Results

Final

References

Results

Relay 4x400 Women
Relays at the African Championships in Athletics
2012 in women's athletics